This is a list of presidential visits to foreign countries made by Joachim Gauck, the former President of Germany. Gauck was elected and assumed the office for a five-year term on 18 March 2012, following the resignation of Christian Wulff and served until 18 March 2017.

2012

2013

2014

2015

2016

2017

References

External links
 Official website about the appointments and journeys of the Federal President of Germany

State visits by German presidents
Lists of diplomatic trips